Artimus L. Parker (January 16, 1952 – May 31, 2004) was an American football safety who played for four seasons in the National Football League. He played for the Philadelphia Eagles from 1974 to 1976 and the New York Jets in 1977. He was drafted by the Eagles in the 12th round of the 1974 NFL Draft. He played college football at USC.

References

External links
New York Jets bio

1952 births
2004 deaths
All-American college football players
Players of American football from Winston-Salem, North Carolina
American football safeties
American football cornerbacks
USC Trojans football players
Philadelphia Eagles players
New York Jets players